Italy competed at the World Games 2017  in Wroclaw, Poland, from 20 July 2017 to 30 July 2017.

Competitors

Aerobic Gymnastic

Mixed

Air Sports

Men

Archery

Men

Women

Boules Sports

Men Singles

Men's Doubles

Women Singles

Women's Doubles

Bowling

Men's Singles

Men's Doubles

Canoe Polo

Women's tournament

Team roster

Martina Anastasi
Roberta Catania
Silvia Gogoni
Maddalena Lago
Flavia Landolina
Ada Prestipino
Maria Anna Szczepanska
Chiara Trevisan

Men's tournament

Team roster

Luca Bellini
Andrea Bertellini
Edoarda Corvaia
Gianluca Distefano
Gianmarco Emanuele
Jan Erik Haack
Marco Porzio
Andrea Romano

Dance sports

Fin swimming

Men

Women

Indoor Rowing

Men

Gymnastic

Rhythmic Gymnastics
Italy  has qualified at the 2017 World Games:

Women's individual event - 1 quota

Ju-Jitsu

Men

Women

Mixed

Karate

Men

Women

Kickboxing

Women

References

External links
ITA - Italy Athletes: 121 Teams: 25 Medals: 34

Nations at the 2017 World Games
2017
2017 in Italian sport